J. S. R. (Roy) Chisholm (26 November 1926 – 10 August 2015) was an English mathematical physicist. He was Professor Emeritus of Applied Mathematics at the University of Kent in Canterbury, where he worked from its founding in 1965 until 1994. Before that he held positions at the University of Glasgow (1951-1954) and Cardiff (1954-1962) following which he was appointed Dublin University Professor of Natural Philosophy at Trinity College Dublin (1962-1966).  He held BA (1948) and PhD (1952) degrees from Cambridge.

Chisholm developed a method for rational approximations of two variable functions generalising Padé approximant.

Books
An Introduction to Statistical Mechanics, with A.H.de Borde, Pergamon Press (1958)
Mathematical Methods in Physics, with Rosa Morris, North-Holland (1964)
Vectors in Three-Dimensional Space (Cambridge University Press,1978)
Clifford Algebras and Their Applications in Mathematical Physics, co-edited with A.K.Common (Reidel 1986)
Clifford Analysis and its Applications, co-eds F.Brackx & V.Soucek (Kluwer 2001)
Changing Stations, a Campus Drama (Moat Sole 2014)

References

1926 births
2015 deaths
English mathematicians
Academics of the University of Kent
Alumni of Christ's College, Cambridge